Kalabakan is a Sabahan language spoken by members of the Tidong ethnic group in Kalabakan District, Sabah, Malaysia.

References

Murutic languages
Languages of Sabah
Endangered Austronesian languages
Languages of Malaysia